Mike Dillon (born February 1, 1965) is an American former professional stock car racing driver for Richard Childress Racing, and the current general manager for the team after having raced in all three national series. He is the son-in-law of Richard Childress.

Racing career

Winston Cup Series
Dillon made one Cup Series start in his career. Subbing for the injured Mike Skinner, he qualified the No. 31 Lowe's Chevrolet in the 27th position in the 1998 Fontana race. Dillon struggled in the race, finishing 35th, 11 laps down.

Dillon also competed in the 1997 Mountain Dew Southern 500 as a relief driver for Dale Earnhardt, finishing the race after Earnhardt blacked out on the first lap.

Busch Series
Dillon made his NASCAR debut in 1995. That year he ran five of twenty-six races for Richard Childress Racing in the No. 12 Kennametal/Salem National Lease Chevrolet, making his debut at Hickory, where he started 12th and finished 16th. He would make his next start at Myrtle Beach, getting his first career top-10 starting spot of 9th, before leading 5 laps en route to a 17th-place finish. He would then follow it up with an 18th place result at South Boston Speedway. Dillon crashed out of the other two races, with a 42nd at Charlotte and 29th at Rockingham. However, he did beat his best career start with an 8th place start in Charlotte.

Dillon ran for NASCAR Busch Series Rookie of the Year in 1996 in the No. 72 Detroit Gasket Chevy for Parker Racing, but only made 21 of 26 races and struggled to 23rd in points. He earned his first career top-10 of 10th at South Boston.

Dillon made all the races in 1997, and finished 15th in points. Still running in the #72, Dillon scored his first career top-5 at Dover. He also added on a pair of 6th and a 10th to have 4 top-10 finishes. Dillon set his career best start of 4th at Richmond, and also led 21 laps at Gateway before a late crash.

Dillon's best career season came in 1998. He had 2 top-5s and 7 top-10s en route to 12th in points. The two top-5s were a 4th at Hickory (led 54 laps) and a 5th at Watkins Glen International.

In 1999, he moved to the #59 Kingsford team owned by ST Motorsports. He did not qualify for two of the races and that relegated him to 16th in the final points. In addition, Dillon only had one top-10, with a 7th place coming at Watkins Glen. Despite the lack of top-10s, Dillon stayed in 16th in points largely because he finished all but two of his races.

In 2000, Dillon moved back to Richard Childress Racing (RCR), driving the newly formed #21 Rockwell Automation Chevrolet. Dillon did not improve that much, as he did not qualify for the season ending race at Miami, and his best finishes were a pair of top-10s. (9th at Daytona and 8th at Dover). The result was 23rd in points.

Dillon's driving career ended in 2001 after getting injured in a wreck at Bristol Motor Speedway. Before then, Dillon had no top-10s and his best 2001 finish was 18th at Atlanta. The following was a quote from RCR:

"Richard Childress Racing (RCR) named Mike Skinner as the driver for its BGN #21 Rockwell Automation team this weekend at Texas while fulltime driver Mike Dillon recuperates from injuries sustained from a March 24 crash at Bristol. "Mike (Dillon) took a hard lick at Bristol so he's pretty sore and stiff," said Richard Childress, president and CEO of Richard Childress Racing Enterprises, Inc. "He also took a hard lick a couple of weeks ago testing in Nashville. Everyone knows racing at Texas Motor Speedway can be very tough. So, to do what's best for our team and for Rockwell Automation, we've asked Skinner to step in for now to get the job done."  None of Dillon's injuries were serious and a CT scan proved negative. His status will be reevaluated after this weekend."

Dillon was more injured than originally thought, and eventually, Dillon quietly stepped aside from the team. Mike Dillon currently serves as the General Manager of Richard Childress Racing's three NASCAR Cup teams. Beginning in 2007, Dillon was the spotter for the Richard Childress owned #33, then driven by Clint Bowyer.

Craftsman Truck Series
Dillon made three career starts in the Craftsman Truck Series, all for Richard Childress. In 1997, Dillon made his debut at Phoenix driving the #33 Realtree Chevy, where he started 29th and finished 26th.

The other two starts were in 1999, running at Watkins Glen and Milwaukee. The 26th in '97 would remain his best finish as he finished 30th at the Glen and 32nd at Milwaukee. However, he did set his career best start of 24th at Watkins Glen.

Personal life 
Dillon's sons Austin and Ty compete in the NASCAR Cup Series. Mike is the son-in-law of Richard Childress.

Motorsports career results

NASCAR
(key) (Bold – Pole position awarded by qualifying time. Italics – Pole position earned by points standings or practice time. * – Most laps led.)

Winston Cup Series

Busch Series

Craftsman Truck Series

References

External links
 

Living people
1965 births
People from Lexington, North Carolina
Racing drivers from North Carolina
NASCAR drivers
Richard Childress Racing drivers